This is a list of notable companies headquartered in Northern Virginia. The majority of the following companies are located in Fairfax County and Loudoun County the most populous jurisdictions in Northern Virginia, Virginia state, and the Baltimore-Washington metropolitan area. Companies with a McLean or Vienna address are often located in Tysons Corner; "Tysons Corner" was not available as a postal address until 2011.

Communications

Iridium Communications (McLean)
Morcom International, Inc. (Chantilly)
NeuStar (Sterling)
NII Holdings (Reston)
OneWeb (Arlington)
SkyTerra (Reston)
SpaceQuest, Ltd. (Fairfax)
t/Space (Reston)
Transmitter Location Systems (Chantilly)
XO Communications (Herndon)

Consumer goods

Alpha Industries (Chantilly)
Aspetto (Fredericksburg)
Bare International (Fairfax)
CustomInk (Fairfax)
Mars, Incorporated (McLean)
ThinkGeek (Fairfax)

Education

Stride, Inc. (Herndon)
Meridian Knowledge Solutions (Reston)
Strayer University (Herndon)
The Teaching Company (Chantilly)

Energy

AES Corporation (Arlington)
GridPoint (Arlington)
Touchstone Energy (Arlington)

Finance

Arlington Asset Investment (Arlington)
Capital One (McLean)
E-Trade (Arlington)
FBR Capital Markets (Arlington)
Freddie Mac (McLean)
Navy Federal Credit Union (Vienna)
Strategic Investment Group (Arlington)

Government contractors

Government contracting companies (including defense contracting companies) may be involved in various fields, such as financial services, healthcare, information technology, mercenaries, science, and space technology, sometimes all within the same company. Some of the following companies may only derive a minority of their income from government contracting, but are listed here for organizational purposes.
Academi (Reston)
Accenture (Arlington)
AeroVironment (Arlington)
Alliant Techsystems (Arlington) 
The Analysis Corporation (McLean)
Argon ST (Fairfax)
Booz Allen Hamilton Holding Corp. (McLean)
CACI (Arlington)
Carahsoft (Reston)
Computer Sciences Corporation (Falls Church)
CSRA (Falls Church)
 Delta Tucker Holdings, Inc. (owner of DynCorp International) (Falls Church)
Edge Technologies (Fairfax)
Endgame, Inc. (Arlington) 
Exelis Inc. (McLean)
General Dynamics (Falls Church)
Kellogg Brown and Root Services (Arlington)
Kiewit Federal Group Inc. (Arlington)
Leidos Holdings Inc. (Reston)
Mandiant (Alexandria)
ManTech International (Herndon)
Maximus Inc. (Reston)
Military Professional Resources (Alexandria)
MVM, Inc. (Ashburn)
NJVC (Chantilly)
Nortel Government Solutions (Fairfax)
Northrop Grumman (Falls Church)
Optimized Systems & Solutions (Reston)
Peraton (Herndon)
Rannoch Corp. (Alexandria)
Salient CRGT (Fairfax)
SAIC (McLean)
Stanley (Alexandria)
System Planning Corporation (Arlington)
Technology Service Corporation (Arlington)
Triple Canopy, Inc. (Herndon)
Vinnell (Fairfax)
Xator (Reston)

Internet technology and software

Amazon (Arlington)
AppAssure Software (Reston)
Appian Corporation (Reston)
Applied Predictive Technologies (Arlington)
BookLender (Vienna)
Capitol Advantage (Fairfax)
Cloudpermit (Reston)
ComScore (Reston)
Cvent (Tysons Corner)
Ellucian (Reston)
Geeknet (Fairfax)
Invincea (Fairfax)
Logi Analytics (McLean)
MicroStrategy (McLean)
Motley Fool (Alexandria)
Objective Interface Systems (Herndon)
Opower (Arlington)
Rosetta Stone (Arlington)
ScienceLogic (Reston)
StreetShares (Reston)
ServInt (McLean)
Sogosurvey (Herndon)
ThinkFun (Alexandria)
Verisign (Reston)
Amazon (Arlington) (HQ2)
Vision III Imaging, Inc. (Vienna)
Wrong Planet (Fairfax)
Walmart Labs (Reston)
XA Systems (McLean)

Media

Alhurra (Springfield)
Gannett Company (McLean) 
Graham Holdings Company (Arlington)
Politico (Arlington)
Tegna, Inc. (Tysons Corner)
USA Today (McLean)
Washington Business Journal (Arlington)

Professional services

Alcalde & Fay (Arlington)
Bloomberg BNA (Arlington)
DXC Technology (Ashburn)
Oblon, Spivak, McClelland, Maier & Neustadt (Alexandria)
Corporate Executive Board (Arlington)
Willis Towers Watson (Arlington)

Real estate and hospitality

Beacon Roofing Supply, Inc. (Herndon)
Interstate Hotels & Resorts (Arlington)
Hilton Worldwide (McLean)
Long & Foster (Chantilly)
MakeOffices (McLean)
NVR, Inc. (Reston)
Sunrise Senior Living (McLean)

Transportation

Interstate Van Lines (Springfield)
Robinson Terminal (Alexandria)
Space Adventures (Vienna)
Trailways Transportation System (Fairfax)

Non-profit

Professional/trade organizations
Air Force Association (Arlington)
Aluminum Association (Arlington)
American Anthropological Association (Arlington)
American Optometric Association (Alexandria)
American Society for Radiation Oncology (Fairfax)
Association for Manufacturing Technology (McLean)
Consumer Electronics Association (Arlington)
Graduate Management Admission Council (Reston)
Grocery Manufacturers Association (Arlington)
Helicopter Association International (Alexandria)
Infectious Diseases Society of America (Arlington)
Intelligence and National Security Alliance (Arlington)
National Association of Convenience Stores (Alexandria)
National Automobile Dealers Association (McLean)
National Rifle Association (Fairfax)
National Science Teachers Association (Arlington)
Purple Heart Foundation (Annandale)
Tragedy Assistance Program for Survivors (Arlington)
United States Geospatial Intelligence Foundation (Herndon)

Think tanks
American Civil Rights Union (Alexandria)
Center for Climate and Energy Solutions (Arlington)
Center for Freedom and Prosperity (Alexandria)
Center for International Relations (Arlington)
Concord Coalition (Arlington)
Feminist Majority Foundation (Arlington)
George C. Marshall Institute (Arlington)
Institute for Defense Analyses (Alexandria)
Lexington Institute (Arlington)
Mercatus Center (Arlington)
National Policy Institute (Arlington)
Potomac Institute for Policy Studies (Arlington)
State Policy Network (Arlington)
Streit Council (Annandale)

Financial
In-Q-Tel (Arlington)
Navy Federal Credit Union (Vienna)
Pentagon Federal Credit Union (McLean)

Internet
American Registry for Internet Numbers (Chantilly)
Internet Society (Reston)
Public Interest Registry (Reston)

Other
CNA Corporation (Arlington)
Inova Health System (Falls Church)
Legal Aid Justice Center (Falls Church)
Mitre Corporation (McLean)
National Council on Aging (Arlington)
Noblis (Reston)
PBS (Arlington)
ZERO—The End of Prostate Cancer (Alexandria)

Foreign companies

These are companies based outside the U.S. with a division headquartered in Northern Virginia.
Airbus Group, Inc.  (Herndon)
BAE Systems Customer Solutions  (Arlington)
Dynamotive USA  (McLean)
FNH USA  (Fredericksburg)
Heckler & Koch Inc.  (Ashburn)
Intelsat Corporation  (Tysons)
Lafarge North America  (Herndon)
Lidl  (Arlington)
Mitsubishi Nuclear Energy Systems Inc.  (Arlington)
Nestlé USA  (Arlington)
Gerber Products Company (Arlington)
NTT DATA  (Herndon)
QinetiQ North America  (McLean)
Rolls-Royce North America  (Reston)
Saab Aerotech of America LLC  (Sterling)
Transurban USA Inc  (Springfield)
Volkswagen Group of America  (Herndon)

Regional Offices

The following companies have major regional offices located in the Dulles Technology Corridor:

Accenture
Adobe Systems
AgustaWestland
Amazon Web Services
Amdocs
Airbus
Oath (AOL/Yahoo!)
Apple
AT&T
BAE Systems
Boeing
CA, Inc.
Capgemini
CDW
Charter Communications
Cisco Systems
Cox Communications
Dell
Deloitte
Discovery, Inc.
Warner Bros. Discovery
EMC Corporation
Equinix
ESRI
ExxonMobil
Fairchild Dornier
FireEye
Google
Harris Corporation
Hewlett-Packard
Hewlett-Packard Enterprise
Juniper Networks
IBM
L-3 Communications
Lockheed Martin
Microsoft
Nestle
NEC
NetApp
Nissan Motors
Nutanix
Oracle Corporation
Palo Alto Networks
Perot Systems
Raytheon
Red Hat
Rockwell Collins
Rolls-Royce North America
Salesforce.com
Siemens
Sprint Nextel
Symantec
Tata Communications
Terremark
Time Warner Cable
Unisys
Visa Inc.
Verizon
VMware

History

America Online was headquartered in Northern Virginia during the company's Internet service provider heyday in the 1990s. In the 2000s several Fortune 500 companies relocated from California to Northern Virginia, including Computer Sciences Corporation, Hilton Hotels Corporation, Northrop Grumman, and Science Applications International Corporation.

Active companies formerly headquartered in the region include AOL, Sallie Mae, Sigarms Inc., and US Airways. Defunct companies that were headquartered in the region include BearingPoint, Braddock Dunn & McDonald, Capital Airlines, Erol's, GeoEye, Hecht's, MCI Inc., Mobil, Mythic Entertainment, Nextel, Proxicom, PSINet, TechAmerica, TerreStar Corporation, UUNET, and Voxant.

References

See also
List of federal agencies in Northern Virginia
List of space companies and facilities in Virginia

Companies
Virginia, Northern
Companies headquartered in Northern Virginia
Northern Virginia